Kuwait participated in the 2010 Asian Para Games–First Asian Para Games in Guangzhou, China from 13 to 19 December 2010. Kuwait won three medals, and finished at the 26th spot in a medal table. Unaffected by its Asian Games counterpart suspension by the International Olympic Committee, it participated at the sporting event under its own national flag.

See also 
 Athletes from Kuwait at the 2010 Summer Youth Olympics
 Athletes from Kuwait at the 2010 Asian Games
 Athletes from Kuwait at the 2011 Asian Winter Games

References

Nations at the 2010 Asian Para Games
2010 in Kuwaiti sport